Disney's Beach Club Resort is a beach-themed deluxe resort at the Walt Disney World Resort. It opened on November 19, 1990. The resort is owned and operated by Disney Parks, Experiences and Products.

Disney's Beach Club Resort is in the Epcot Resort Area, next to a sister resort, Disney's Yacht Club Resort, and across Crescent Lake from Disney's BoardWalk Resort. Disney's Yacht Club Resort and Disney's Beach Club Resort and Villas share amenities and resources, including staff, management, and busses. Disney's Beach Club Resort is home to a  convention center, which is shared with Disney's Yacht Club Resort.

Resort

This hotel was designed by the firm of the 2011 Driehaus Prize winner, Robert A.M. Stern Architects., and themed after the seaside cottages of 19th century Newport. The resort's light blue color distinguishes it from the gray siding with red and white striped awnings of Disney's Yacht Club Resort.

Boat transportation from the resort runs to Epcot and Disney's Hollywood Studios, as well as Disney's Boardwalk Resort and the Walt Disney World Swan and Walt Disney World Dolphin resorts. The resort is approximately five minutes walking distance from Epcot, and roughly fifteen minutes walking distance to Disney's Hollywood Studios. Guests can use the International Gateway entrance to Epcot in World Showcase between the France and United Kingdom pavilions.

Disney's Beach Club Resort has received the designation in the Florida Green Lodging Program.

There are both standard rooms (two queen-size beds or one king-size bed) and suites.  Some rooms also have a daybed besides 2 Queen beds or 1 King bed.  The resort also offers a fifth floor Concierge Level, with private floor access, a concierge lounge, turndown service, and other amenities. The Concierge Level is home to the resort's Presidential Suite. All rooms were renovated in 2009. Rooms were also renovated from 2015 to 2016. Rooms still have a beach theme, but are more modern, with shades of gray, brown, and light blue. The hallways were also re-painted and re-papered, along with new carpets and new colors on the doors of the rooms.

In addition, vacation homes at Disney's Beach Club Villas are collapsed into three different sized accommodations, ranging from studios that sleep 4, one-bedroom villas that sleep 4, and two-bedroom villas that sleep 8.

Entertainment

Dining

Disney's Beach Club Resort shares facilities with Disney's Yacht Club Resort and together features three full-service restaurants, a poolside counter-service restaurant, two marketplaces, and several bars and lounges.  The main restaurant at the Beach Club is Cape May Cafe, which offers a New England style clambake buffet most nights for dinner and a traditional buffet daily for breakfast. Disney characters stroll around the tables during breakfast and greet guests. At the Beach Club itself, guests can find:

 Cape May Cafe – A casual dining restaurant.
 Martha's Vineyard Lounge – A bar near the pool area.
 Beaches & Cream Soda Shop – A casual dining restaurant serving ice cream and All-American food.
 Beach Club Marketplace - A Convenience Store Serving Sandwiches, Salads, Gelato and Other Quick Service Items.
 Hurricane Hanna's – A poolside counter service restaurant and full bar.

Pools

 Stormalong Bay – The main 3-acre pool complex at Disney's Yacht and Beach Club resorts that resembles a beach-side water park with its sand-bottom pools, a circular lazy river, waterfall, and the "Shipwreck", a large replica of a shipwreck with one of the highest resort water slides at Walt Disney World. The Stormalong Bay pool complex offers a poolside counter service restaurant and bar, a shallow area for children, and an elevated tanning deck. Stormalong Bay is centrally between both the Beach Club Resort and the Yacht Club Resort, facing Crescent Lake. Stormalong Bay is constantly regarded as the best pool at Walt Disney World.
Dunes Cove - A small pool with depths ranging up to about five feet, changing/bathroom facilities, a jacuzzi tub and barbecue grills.
 Quiet pools – The Beach Club Resort's quiet pool and jacuzzi are on the opposite far end of the resort, facing Crescent Lake in a similar garden area. Another pool is privately in the Beach Club Villas building facing a smaller lake.

Recreation
 Ship Shape Health Club - A health and fitness center. The health club is centrally between both the Beach Club Resort and the Yacht Club Resort.
 Lafferty Place Arcade – An indoor arcade near the Beaches & Cream Soda Shop.
 Marina - The resort's lakeside marina 
 Sandcastle Club – The Sandcastle Club is a child drop-off center.
 Beach -  A white sand beach on Crescent Lake. Different Activities are also held on the beach, including Movie Nights and Campfire Sing-Alongs.
 Volleyball – A lakeside volleyball court.

Convention center

References

External links

 
 Disney's Beach Club Villas

Hotel buildings completed in 1990
Hotels established in 1990
Beach Club Resort
Beach Club
Robert A. M. Stern buildings
1990 establishments in Florida